Deputy assistant secretary is a title borne by government executives in certain countries, usually senior officials assigned to a specific assistant secretary.

United States

In the United States, the rank of deputy assistant secretary denotes a Senior Executive Service (SES) official within the United States federal government who reports to an assistant secretary.  Career deputy assistant secretaries are generally appointed by the secretary who heads the department. Non-career SESs are appointed by the president of the United States and are assigned to specific department. In sub-cabinet agencies, headed by an administrator or director rather than a secretary, a comparable position is referred to as a deputy assistant administrator or deputy assistant director.

See also

Cabinet secretary
Undersecretary
Assistant secretary

References

United States federal executive department officials